Castle Reef is an  mountain summit located in Teton County of the U.S. state of Montana.

Description

Castle Reef is located in the Rocky Mountain Front, which is a subset of the Rocky Mountains. It is situated 26 miles west-southwest of Choteau, in Lewis and Clark National Forest. Precipitation runoff from the mountain drains into tributaries of the Sun River. Neighbors include Sawtooth Ridge seven miles to the south, and Ear Mountain 11 miles to the north.

Geology

Castle Reef is composed of sedimentary rock laid down during the Precambrian to Jurassic periods. Formed in shallow seas, this sedimentary rock was pushed east and over the top of younger rock during the Laramide orogeny. The Castle Reef Formation takes its name from Castle Reef, as it is the type locality.

Climate

Based on the Köppen climate classification, Castle Reef is located in a subarctic climate zone characterized by long, usually very cold winters, and mild to warm summers. Winter temperatures can drop below −10 °F with wind chill factors below −30 °F.

See also

 Geology of the Rocky Mountains

References

External links
 Weather: Castle Reef
 NGS Data Sheet

Mountains of Montana
North American 2000 m summits
Lewis and Clark National Forest